Philip Rosseter (1568 – 5 May 1623) was an English composer and musician, as well as a theatrical manager. His family seems to have been from Somerset or Lincolnshire, he may have been employed with the Countess of Sussex by 1596, and he was living in London by 1598. In 1604 Rosseter was appointed a court lutenist for James I of England, a position he held until his death in 1623. Rosseter is best known for A Book of Ayres which was written with Thomas Campion and published in 1601. Some literary critics have held that Campion wrote the poems for Rosseter's songs; however, this seems not to be the case. It is likely that Campion was the author of the book's preface, which criticizes complex counterpoint and "intricate" harmonies that leave the words inaudible. The two men had a close professional and personal relationship; when Campion died in 1620, he had named Rosseter his sole heir.

Rosseter's lute songs are generally short, homophonic, with minimal repetition or word painting (imitating textual meanings through music), while at the same time being rich in musical invention. Rosseter's only other book was Lessons for Consort (1609) for a broken consort of bandora, cittern, lute, flute, and treble and bass viol, which contains arrangements of his own and others' music.

Rosseter was also involved in the Jacobean theatre. In 1609 he and Robert Keysar became shareholders in a company of boy actors, the Children of the Chapel. The company had lost their royal patronage in 1606 as a result of their satire of Jacobean court scandals, but Rosseter was permitted to restore their former title, the Children of the Queen's Revels, in 1610. Rosseter remained connected to the Jacobean court during this period, in 1612 and 1613 he produced three play by the "Children of the Chapel" for Prince Charles, Princess Elizabeth and the Prince Palatine, and he played the lute on 15 February 1613 in George Chapman's The Memorable Masque of the Middle Temple and Lincoln's Inn, a part of the celebrations at the wedding of Princess Elizabeth and Frederick V of the Palatinate.

In 1614, the Children of the Queen's Revels' lease for Whitefriars Theatre expired, and Rosseter obtained a license from King James to build a new theatre at Porter's Hall, near the Blackfriars Theatre. Boundary changes brought the site within the City of London, however, where the lord mayor and aldermen strongly objected to the establishment of the theater. After a controversial trial in which Lord Chief Justice Coke found for the London authorities, the nearly-completed playhouse was demolished in 1617. Rosseter made attempts to operate the boy actors, now known as the Children of the Late Queen's Revels, as a touring company, but he withdrew as a shareholder by 1620, and the company disbanded shortly afterwards.

A piece entitled Rosseter's Galliard by Giles Farnaby is included in the Fitzwilliam Virginal Book (no. CCLXXXIII), probably a setting of one of Rosseter's compositions.

One of his compositions was used by Martin Shaw and then arranged by Mont Campbell to become 'Garden of Earthly Delights' on the album Arzachel by Prog Rock group Uriel in 1969.

Footnotes

References
Campion, Thomas and Philip Rosseter. A booke of ayres, set foorth to be song to the lute, orpherian, and base violl (London, 1601), Early English Books Online (Retrieved 11 August 2013),  (subscription access).
Greer, David. "Philip Rosseter", Grove Music Online, ed. L. Macy (Retrieved 16 October 2006), grovemusic.com (subscription access).
Halliday, F. E. A Shakespeare Companion 1564-1964, Baltimore, Penguin, 1964.
Harwood, Ian. "Philip Rosseter", Oxford Dictionary of National Biography (Retrieved 11 August 2013), www.oxforddnb.com (subscription access).

External links

Video of "When Laura smiles" by Philip Rosseter performed by Valeria Mignaco, soprano & Alfonso Marin, lute
Philip Rosseter performed by lutenist Brian Wright
Music Collection in Cambridge Digital Library which contains early copies/examples of Rosseter's compositions

1560s births
1623 deaths
English classical composers
English lutenists
English Baroque composers
16th-century English composers
17th-century English composers
17th-century classical composers
English male classical composers
17th-century male musicians